Welcome to Arrow Beach is a 1974 American horror film directed by and starring Laurence Harvey. Following its limited theatrical release, an edited version of the film was reissued in 1976 under the title Tender Flesh.

Plot

Robbin Stanley, a young hitchhiker, left stranded after a car crash and wandering on a California beach, is taken in by Jason Henry, a photographer and Korean War veteran, who lives in a nearby beach front house with his sister Grace. After Jason confides that Grace has some mental problems, Robbin soon begins to suspect that the opposite applies and that the mansion is home to some very strange goings-on.

Cast

Production
Filming began in February 1973. Harvey was very ill during the shoot from cancer. Harvey died in late 1973 before the film's release.  Lou Rawls sings the opening song "Who Can Tell Us Why".

The full-length running time of the film is 99 minutes.

Reception
The film took a year to be released. The Los Angeles Times called the film "a dreary, tedious tale".

Harvey said the film was "vaguely reminiscent of Suddenly Last Summer... it could be labeled a contemporary parable about innocence in a very sick world". He later called the film a thriller "which makes no comment on anything."

References

External links

1974 films
1974 horror films
American horror thriller films
Films set on beaches
Warner Bros. films
1970s English-language films
1970s American films